|}

The Daisy Warwick Stakes is a Listed flat horse race in Great Britain open to mares and fillies aged four years or older.
It is run at Goodwood Racecourse over a distance of 1 mile 3 furlongs and 218 yards (2,412 metres), and it is scheduled to take place each year in late April or early May.

The race was run for the first time in 2011.

Records
Most successful horse:
 no horse has won this race more than once

Leading jockey:
 no jockey has won this race nore than once

Leading trainer (2 wins):
 John Gosden - Getrude Bell (2011), Enbihaar (2019)

Winners

See also 
Horse racing in Great Britain
List of British flat horse races

References

Racing Post:

Flat races in Great Britain
Goodwood Racecourse
Long-distance horse races for fillies and mares
Recurring sporting events established in 2011
2011 establishments in England